Chetan Mal Arwani (born 1 March 1963) is a Pakistani Hindu politician. A member of the opposition Pakistan Muslim League (Q), he holds a seat reserved for non-Muslims in the Provincial Assembly of Sindh.

Family and personal life

Career

References

1967 births
Pakistani Hindus
Pakistan Muslim League (Q) politicians
People from Tharparkar District
Thari people
Living people
Members of the Provincial Assembly of Sindh